"Do Ya Wanna Funk" is a 1982 dance song recorded by American recording artists Sylvester and Patrick Cowley. It was produced by Cowley, who incidentally died the same year. The song was mostly successful in Europe, especially in Belgium, Finland and Norway, where it became a top-10 hit. It also reached the top 20 in the Netherlands and Switzerland, and made it to the top 30 in West Germany and Australia, and the top 40 in the United Kingdom. The song was inspired by "I'm Your Jeanie", a single by Jeanie Tracy, who was a background vocalist for Sylvester. It was also featured in the film Trading Places (1983). In 2022, Rolling Stone ranked "Do Ya Wanna Funk" number 179 in their list of 200 Greatest Dance Songs of All Time.

Track listing
 12", US'
 "Do Ya Wanna Funk" - 6:47
 "Do Ya Wanna Funk" (instrumental) - 6:47
 "Do Ya Wanna Funk" (radio version) -  3:29

 12", UK
 "Do Ya Wanna Funk" - 6:47
 "Do Ya Wanna Funk" (instrumental) - 6:47
 "Do Ya Wanna Funk" (radio version) -  3:29

 12", Lebanon
 "Do Ya Wanna Funk" - 5:30 remixed By Dj petro 1994

Charts

Personnel
Sylvester - voices
Patrick Cowley - synthesizers and sequencer
James Wirrick - synthesizers and drum machine

Appearances in film
The song is heard throughout the entire scene where Billy Ray Valentine hosts a party in Trading Places, a comedy movie starring Eddie Murphy as Billy Ray Valentine and Dan Aykroyd as Louis Winthorp III. The song also appears in the 1989 AIDS drama Longtime Companion, as well as the 2001 TV miniseries Further Tales of the City, and in both cases its use is an anachronism, being heard in scenes set a year before the song was even released. The song was also featured in the 1984 Oscar-winning documentary The Times of Harvey Milk. The song is covered by Sandra Bernhard in the 1990 film version of her stage show, Without You I'm Nothing. It is also featured in the 2021 Channel 4 TV series “It’s a Sin”  during a club scene whilst Richie explains the various theories around the origins of HIV.

References

1982 singles
Sylvester (singer) songs
Songs written by Patrick Cowley
London Records singles
1982 songs